Pond is an unincorporated community in Kern County, California, United States.

Pond was established around 1889. A post office opened at Pond in 1912.

Merle Haggard's song "The Train Never Stops At Our Town," was written by nearby Bakersfield resident, Dallas Frazier, about the struggle of life in Pond, and how difficult it was to leave the "Poor Man's Valley" (San Joaquin Valley) compounded by the fact the train did not stop in Pond.

References

Unincorporated communities in Kern County, California
Populated places established in 1889
Unincorporated communities in California